Sears plc was a large British-based conglomerate. The company was listed on the London Stock Exchange and was once a constituent of the FTSE 100 Index. It was acquired by Philip Green in 1999.

History
The business was founded by John and William Sears in 1891 and initially traded as bootmakers under the name of Trueform. It had acquired Freeman, Hardy and Willis by 1929. The business was acquired by Charles Clore in 1953. He renamed it Sears Holdings in 1955; it went on to buy the Manfield and Dolcis shoe shop chains the following year.

In the late 1950s Clore consolidated all the shoe brands Sears had acquired under the name British Shoe Corporation under which name it also bought Saxone, Manfield, Lilley & Skinner, another shoe shop chain, in 1962.

Despite the company using the Sears name, it has no relations with Chicago, Illinois-based Sears Roebuck and Company and its 2005-2019 parent company, Hoffman Estates, Illinois-based Sears Holdings Corporation.

Sears decided to invest in department stores in 1965 acquiring Lewis's Investment Trust which itself controlled Selfridges.

In 1966, Selfridges launched the Miss Selfridge department, which subsequently expanded to a store chain in its own right.

The company diversified again in 1971, buying William Hill, a chain of bookmakers.

Sears bought Wallis in 1980 and Foster Brothers Clothing, which owned Adams Childrenswear, in 1985. and in the same year was renamed Sears plc (PLC meaning Public Limited Company). It acquired Richard Shops in 1992.

As at April 1995, the company was FTSE 100 listed and had the following brands:

Wallis, Warehouse, Miss Selfridge, Adams Childrenswear, Shoe Express, Shoe City, Saxone, Dolcis, Cable & Co, The Outfit, Lilley & Skinner, Freemans Catalogue Store, Selfridges, The Selfridges Hotel, Part ownership of The St. Enoch Shopping Centre in Glasgow, 3,000 retail shops being mostly leasehold with a few freehold jewels such as 190 Oxford Street and 330 Oxford Street known as the Top Shop flagship store.

In 1996 sold FHW, Manfield, True Form, Saxone and Curtess to entrepreneur Stephen Hinchliffe and his business Facia. The remaining parts of British Shoe Corporation were sold by 1998, at an accounting loss of £150 million.

Sears plc was acquired by January Investments on behalf of Philip Green in January 1999. The womenswear business (comprising Warehouse, Richards, Wallis and Miss Selfridge) was subsequently transferred to Arcadia Group. Philip Green later purchased the Arcadia Group, regaining control of Wallis and Miss Selfridge alongside Arcadia's other brands (Arcadia having closed Richards, and sold Warehouse to Rubicon Retail).

Sears Group Properties, a wholly owned subsidiary, was sold to the owner of department store Owen Owen, and continues to operate as an outsourced property solution for other fashion brands.

SPDL (Sears Property Developments Limited), a wholly owned subsidiary of Sears plc, was swallowed up by January Investments but the retail park development properties asset strip generated around £50 million. These included Parc Fforestfach (A483 Pontardulais Road, Swansea) and Westway Cross Retail Park (Greenford). The Sears Property Developments Limited team of four contributed in excess of £10 million per annum in profits between 1995 and 1999 and was Sears "secret weapon." The Timess unfavourable commentary regarding SPDL's property development pipeline (stating it was involved in risky developments) arguably led to Sears plc becoming a bid target.

Brands after demise of Sears
Adams Childrenswear - trading as 'Adams Kids' - remained on the high street until 2010, after some difficulties over the years, and collapsed into administration twice in the late 2000s; former Stead & Simpson chairman John Shannon purchased a portion of the chain's outlets and the Adams brand, before the company fell into administration for a third time in 2010. The brand survives as an online business.

William Hill is owned by 888 Holdings and is one of the largest betting and gaming organisations in the United Kingdom.

Selfridges is owned by Selfridges Group (itself owned 50% by Thai Central Group & Austrian Signa Holdings) it has expanded out of London with branches in Manchester & Birmingham.

Lewis's was split from Selfridges and was placed into administration in 1991. Branches in Liverpool, Manchester, Oxford, Leeds and Hanley were bought out by Owen Owen.

Richard Shops were closed down by Arcadia Group shortly after the firm took the chain over from Sears. Miss Selfridge and Wallis remain part of Arcadia, and the firm has also continued to develop and evolve the Outfit out-of-town fashion store format initially developed by Sears. Arcadia sold Warehouse as part of the deal which created Rubicon Retail in 2002. Subsequently, Rubicon merged with Mosaic Fashions, and following the collapse of Mosaic, Warehouse is in the hands of Aurora Fashions, which took on many of Mosaic's brands.

References

Defunct companies based in London
Conglomerate companies established in 1891
Conglomerate companies disestablished in 1999
1999 disestablishments in England
Clothing retailers of the United Kingdom
1891 establishments in England